Khobz (bread) or Khobz el-dâr (bread of the house) is a type of Maghrebi leavened bread made in a round and somewhat flat loaf. It is often homemade, and typically prepared with white flour mixed with whole wheat or semolina flour. It is sometimes flavored with anise seeds. A thinner version, Khobz al-tajin, is cooked in an earthenware pan. An oven-cooked version, about an inch thick, was traditionally prepared at home and then taken to a communal oven to be baked; some bakeries still offer this service.

See also

 List of breads

References

Algerian cuisine
Arab cuisine
Moroccan cuisine
Breads